The South Devon is a British breed of large beef cattle. It originated in the counties of Devon and Cornwall in south-west England, and is mentioned from the eighteenth century. It was a dual-purpose breed, kept both for its milk and for beef. Since 1972 selection has been for beef only.

History 

The South Devon originated in the counties of Devon and Cornwall in south-west England: the earliest mentions of it are from the eighteenth century. How it developed is not known; one theory is that it arose from cross-breeding between local Devon stock and Channel Islands cattle such as the Alderney. Unlike other British breeds, the South Devon carries the gene for haemoglobin B, which is also present in the Channel Island breeds.

The South Devon Herd Book Society of England was formed, and published the first edition of the herd-book in 1891.

Some were exported to the United States in either 1936 or 1969,, and then again in 1974. A breed society was formed in 1972.

Characteristics 

The South Devon is a large breed: bulls stand on average  at the withers, cows some  less. The coat is curly and light red in colour; the cattle are both larger and paler than other British breeds of red cattle. They may be either horned or polled; the horns are yellowish or white, and downward-curved.

Use 

Until the early part of the nineteenth century the South Devon was a triple-purpose animal, kept for its milk, for meat and for draught work. Thereafter it was a dual-purpose breed, valued for its dairy qualities while the quality of the carcase was not high. In the early twentieth century, the average milk yield was over  kg per lactation; a good cow might give  kg, and at least one reached  kg. In 1974 the average lactation yield was  kg, with a fat content of 4.19%; some cows exceeded  kg. The conformation of the udder was not well suited to mechanical milking, and from 1972 selection was for beef only.

It is a large and fast-growing breed.

Approximately 37% of the population carries the 11-bp genetic mutation which causes bovine muscular hypertrophy (or more properly hyperplasia), which in the area of origin of the breed is known as "buffalo". In affected animals this has the expected beneficial influence on carcase yield, and the expected detrimental effects on meat quality and on ease of calving.

References

Cattle breeds originating in England
Cattle breeds
Red cattle
Environment of Devon